The Tuchel district was a Prussian district in Germany that existed from 1875 to 1920. It was in the part of West Prussia that fell to Poland after World War I through the Treaty of Versailles. Its capital was Tuchel.

History 
The area of the Tuchel district was annexed by the Kingdom of Prussia through the First Partition of Poland in 1772 and was part of the Konitz district. On April 30, 1815, the area became part of the new administrative region of Marienwerder in the province of West Prussia. From December 3, 1829, to April 1, 1878, West Prussia and East Prussia were united to form the Province of Prussia, which had belonged to the German Reich since 1871.

Due to the steady population growth in the 19th century, several districts proved to be too large and a reduction in size was necessary. Therefore, in 1875, the new Tuchel district was created from parts of the Konitz district. The district office was set up in the town of Tuchel (Tuchola). As a result of the Versailles Treaty, the district had to be ceded by Germany to Poland on January 10, 1920.

Demographics 
The Tuchel district had a majority Polish population with a significant German minority.

Politics

District administrators 

 1879–1885:  Ludwig Blümke
 1885–1891:  Clemens von Delbrück
 1891–1895:  Ernst Reinhold Gerhard von Glasenapp
 1895–1904:  Emil Venske
 1904–1914:  Richard von Puttkamer
 1914–1919:  Hugo Tortilowicz von Batocki-Friebe

Elections 
In the German Empire, the Tuchel district together with the Konitz district formed the Reichstag constituency of Marienwerder 6. This constituency was won by candidates from the Polish Party in all elections to the Reichstag between 1871 and 1912.

Municipalities 
In 1912, the Tuchel district included the town of Tuchel and 54 rural communities:

Landkreis Tuchel in occupied Poland (1939–1945)

History 
After the German invasion of Poland, the district became part of the newly formed Reichsgau Danzig-West Prussia - in the administrative region of Bromberg. The town of Tuchel was subject to the German municipal code of January 30, 1935, which was valid in the Altreich and provided for the implementation of the Führerprinzip at the municipal level.

Place names 
On June 25, 1942, all place names were Germanized. Either the name from 1918 was retained or - if "not German" enough - acoustically adjusted or translated, for example:

 Bralewitz → Wilhelmsflur
 Drausnitz → Drausnest
 Groß Bislaw → Bislau
 Groß Klonia → Klehnboden
 Groß Komorze → Waldkammer
 Kamionka → Heidefließ
 Klein Bislaw → Bislauheim
 Lubotschin → Laub
 Przyrowo → Christinenfelde
 Stobno → Stöbensee

References 

Tuchola County
1920 disestablishments in Poland
1875 establishments in Prussia
Tuchel